Torzeniec  is a village in the administrative district of Gmina Doruchów, within Ostrzeszów County, Greater Poland Voivodeship, in west-central Poland.

History
During the German invasion of Poland at the start of World War II in September 1939, while fighting at night, German troops mistakenly fired on each other and then blamed the local Polish inhabitants. In "retaliation," German soldiers set fire to the village, shot at fleeing residents, and then organized a nighttime manhunt. Additionally, they executed 18 captured Polish men the next morning (see Nazi crimes against the Polish nation).

References

Villages in Ostrzeszów County
Nazi war crimes in Poland